Munster Senior League is an independent football league formed in Cork, Ireland in 1922-23, and now affiliated with the Munster Football Association, Football Association of Ireland, UEFA and FIFA.

Premier Division 

 {| class="wikitable" 
! width="20" |
! width="150" style="text-align:left;" |Team
! width="20" |
! width="20" |
! width="20" |
! width="20" |
! width="30" |
! width="50" |
! width="20" |
! width="20" |
!Qualification or Relegation
|- style="background:#ccffcc"
|1
| align="left" |Ringmahon Rangers
|1
|1
|0
|0
|5
|0
|+5
|3
|Champions
|-
|2
|Avondale United
|1
|1
|0
|0
|2
|1
|+1
|3
|
|-
|3
|Carrigaline United
|1
|1
|0
|0
|1
|0
|+1
|3
|
|-
|4
|College Corinthians
|1
|1
|0
|0
|1
|0
|+1
|3
|
|-
|5
|Cobh Wanderers
|0
|0
|0
|0
|0
|0
|+0
|0
|
|-
|6
|UCC
|0
|0
|0
|0
|0
|0
|+0
|0
|
|-
|7
|Midleton
|1
|0
|0
|1
|1
|2
|-1
|0
|
|-
|8
|Douglas Hall
|1
|0
|0
|1
|0
|1
|-1
|0
|
|- style="background:#ffcccc"
|9
|Rockmount
|1
|0
|0
|1
|0
|1
|-1
|0
| rowspan="2" |Relegation to First Division
|- style="background:#ffcccc"
|10
| align="left" |St Marys
|1
|0
|0
|1
|0
|5
|-5
|0
|}

First Division
{| class="wikitable" 
!width=20|
!width=150 style="text-align:left;"|Team
!width=20|
!width=20|
!width=20|
!width=20|
!width=30|
!width=50|
!width=20|
!width=20|
!Qualification or Relegation
|- style="background:#ccffcc"
|1||align=left| Everton
| 1
| 1
| 0
| 0
| 7
| 0
| +7
|3
| rowspan="2" |Promotion to Premier Division
|- style="background:#ccffcc" 
|2||align=left| Castleview
| 1
| 1
| 0
| 0
| 6
| 1
| +5
|3
|-
|3
|Blarney United
|1
|1
|0
|0
|3
|1
|+2
|3
|
|-
|4
|Leeds
|1
|0
|1
|0
|3
|3
|+0
|1
|
|-
|5
|Bandon
|1
|0
|1
|0
|3
|3
|+0
|1
|
|-
|6
|Mayfield United
|1
|0
|1
|0
|2
|2
|+0
|1
|
|-
|7
|Kinsale
|1
|0
|1
|0
|2
|2
|+0
|1
|
|-
|8
|Ballinhassig
|1
|0
|0
|1
|1
|3
|-2
|0
|
|- style="background:#ffcccc"
|9
|Leeside
|1
|0
|0
|1
|1
|6
|-5
|0
| rowspan="2" |Relegation to Second Division
|- style="background:#ffcccc"
|10|| align="left" | Park United
| 1
| 0
| 0
| 1
| 0
| 7
| -7
|0
|}

Second Division 
{| class="wikitable" 
! width="20" |
! width="150" style="text-align:left;" |Team
! width="20" |
! width="20" |
! width="20" |
! width="20" |
! width="30" |
! width="50" |
! width="20" |
! width="20" |
!Qualification or Relegation
|- style="background:#ccffcc"
|1|| align="left" |Riverstown||1||1||0||0||6||2||+4||3
| rowspan="2" |Promotion to First Division
|- style="background:#ccffcc" 
|2|| align="left" |Wilton United||1||1||0||0||4||0||+4||3
|- style="background:#FFFFE0"
|3|| align="left" |Tramore Athletic||1||1||0||0||4||1||+3||3
| rowspan="4" |Qualification to Promotion Play-offs
|- style="background:#FFFFE0"
|4
|Innishvilla
|1
|1
|0
|0
|2
|0
|+2
|3
|- style="background:#FFFFE0"
|5
|Lakewood Athletic
|1
|1
|0
|0
|2
|1
|+1
|3
|- style="background:#FFFFE0"
|6
|Macroom
|1
|1
|0
|0
|1
|0
|+1
|3
|-
|7
|Kilworth Celtic
|0
|0
|0
|0
|0
|0
| +0
|0
|
|-
|8
|Pearse Celtic
|1
|0
|0
|1
|1
|2
| -1
|0
|
|-
|9
|Casement Celtic
|1
|0
|0
|1
|0
|1
| -1
|0
|
|-
|10
|Carrigtwohill United
|1
|0
|0
|1
|0
|2
| -2
|0
|
|-
|11
|Fermoy
|1
|0
|0
|1
|1
|4
| -3
|0
|
|-
|12
|Youghal United
|1
|0
|0
|1
|2
|6
| -4
|0
|
|-
|13
|Buttevant
|1
|0
|0
|1
|0
|4
| -4
|0
|}
Play-Offs

References 

League – Page 152390 – Munster Senior League

Association football in Ireland